Shabdar Osyp (Mari: Шабда́р О́сып, 8 April 1898, Malaya Luzhala – 11 November 1937) was a Mari author.

He was born as Iosif Arkhipovich Shabdarov in the village of Izi Luzhalu in Mari El.

He started writing poetry in 1918. He studied at a pedagogical college in Kazan.

Like most of the Mari intelligentsia at the time, he became a victim of stalinism and was executed in Yoshkar-Ola on 11 November 1937. He was rehabilitated posthumously.

1898 births
1937 deaths
People from Sernursky District
People from Tsaryovokokshaysky Uyezd
Great Purge victims from Russia
Mari people executed by the Soviet Union
Soviet rehabilitations